Sheikh Mujibur Rahman is a Bangladesh Nationalist Party politician. He was elected a member of parliament from Bagerhat-1 in February 1996.

Career 
Prafulla Kumar Mandal was elected to parliament from Bagerhat-1 as a Bangladesh Nationalist Party candidate in 15 February 1996 Bangladeshi general election.

He was defeated from Bagerhat-1 constituency on 12 June 1996 and 2001 on the nomination of Bangladesh Nationalist Party.

References 

Possibly living people
People from Bagerhat District
Bangladesh Nationalist Party politicians
6th Jatiya Sangsad members
Year of birth missing